Sport1 is a German free-to-air television channel centred towards sports programming, including teleshopping and erotica. Until 11 April 2010, it was called DSF (Deutsches Sportfernsehen). It was launched on 1 January 1993 out of the television channel Tele 5 which had become the successor of the music video channel Musicbox on 11 January 1988.

Sport1 has its headquarters in Ismaning near Munich.

Programming

Football

3.Liga (2020–2024) (on Sport1+)
DFB Pokal (2020–2024) (on Sport1+)
DFB-Pokal women (2020–2023)
International Champions Cup (10 of 18 matches (including all German clubs)) 
2. Fußball-Bundesliga: (highlights on Friday & Sunday)
Regionalliga
Scottish Premiership, Championship and League Cup (on Sport1+)
English Football League (exclude EFL Cup) (on Sport1+)
Ligue 1 (on Sport1+)
UEFA European Under-21 Championship (non-Germany matches)
UEFA European Under-19 Championship
UEFA European Under-17 Championship
UEFA Youth League
UEFA Women's Under-19 Championship
UEFA Women's Under-17 Championship
AFC Champions League (2021 and 2022)

Basketball

FIBA World Championship
FIBA World Championship for Women
German national team
Basketball Bundesliga (1 game per week)
NBA (on Sport1+)
NCAA (on Sport1US)

Handball
World Women's Handball Championship
Germany men's national handball team

Other sports

PDC World Darts Championship
ATP World Tour
CEV Champions League
World Ice Hockey Championships
European Tour
NCAA football (on Sport1US)
National Hockey League (on Sport1US)
IndyCar Series
Major League Baseball
XFL

Non-sports

Alone (Alone - Überleben in der Wildnis) (2017–present)
Aussie Pickers (Aussie Pickers - Die Trödelexperten) (2015–2016)
Barry'd Treasure (Barry'd Treasure - Der Trödelexperte) (2016–present)
Big Brian: The Fortune Seller (Big Brian - Der große Ausverkauf) (2015)
Buy It, Fix It, Sell It (Alte Stücke, neuer Glanz) (2017–present)
Chow Masters (Diner Wars) (2015)
Container Wars (2014–present)
Counting Cars (Die Werkstatt-Helden) (2014-2016)
Dig Wars (Dig Wars - Die Schatzgräber) (2015-2017)
Garage Gold (2016–present)
Hard Knocks (2013)
Hardcore Pawn: Chicago (2015-2016)
Storage Hunters (UK) (2015–present)
Storage Hunters (US) (2014–present)
Storage Wars (Storage Wars - Die Geschäftemacher) (2013–present)
The Liquidator (2015–present)
Yukon Gold (2015–present)
Sport Clips (2002–present)

Audience share

Germany

References

External links
  

Television stations in Germany
Football mass media in Germany
German-language television networks
Companies based in Bavaria
Mass media in Munich
Sports television in Germany
Television pornography